Deep Gold is a 2011 action film directed by Michael Gleissner and produced by Bigfoot Entertainment. 
Filmed in and around the islands of Cebu and Palawan in the Philippines it stars Bebe Pham, Jaymee Ong and Laury Prudent.

Synopsis
Amy Sanchez (Bebe Pham) is a champion free diver who breaks a crucial free diving record. Her boyfriend, Tony dela Cruz (Jack Prinya), an Air Force Pilot,  mysteriously disappears along with his plane that carries gold worth millions of dollars that was to be taken to the Central Bank.

Determined to unearth the truth, she goes off to find out what has actually happened accompanied by her sister Jess Sanchez (Jaymee Ong). She moves on her adventurous journey not knowing that she herself is going to get entangled in a trap of lies that will lead her to a much more complex conspiracy.

Cast
 Bebe Pham as Amy Sanchez
 Laury Prudent as Lulu
 Michael Gleissner as Benny Simpson
 Kersten Hui as Chang 
 Kelsey Adams as Young Amy
 Jose Ch. Alvarez as Librarian 
 Madel Amigable as Little Girl #1
 Charry Aying as Little Girl #2
 Markéta Bělonohá as Franchesca 
 Leigh Carcel as Fiona Rabanes
 Grace Hutchings as Young Jess
 Amelia Jackson-Gray as Claire Simpson
 Mon Lacsamana as Henchman Fred
 Charles Lastierre as Air Traffic controller #2
 Chiqui Lastierre as Newspaper Girl 
 Ian Lim as Sgt. Gabriel
 Joe Mercado as General Cordova
 Jude Moore as Frank Townsend 
 Richard Magarey as Frank
 Qt del Mar as Rachel Sanchez
 Larry Mercado as Colonel Diaz 
 Earl Mullen as Henchman Larry
 Jaye Muller as himself
 Jaymee Ong as Jess Sanchez 
 Ben Patton as himself
 Jack Prinya as Tony dela Cruz
 Miguel Ramirez as Henchman Mike 
 Lorenzo Ramos as Ignacio
 Pakawat Suphanakhan as Tony Calderon
 Allan Tercena as Henchman Allan 
 Joel Torre as Ranulfo
 Senyo Torre as Mallman
 Grean Villacarios as Power Company Guy 
 Thomas Watter as Hans
 Jeremiah Sird as Captain Cook

Reception

Deep Gold received a majority of negative reviews.

Critic Brian Orndorf gave it "C" grade and wrote: "Not a film of intelligence or logic, but something candied to offer a few moderate thrills for audiences who prefer their action thick-fingered and cheesy, sold by a good-looking cast with little to no acting ability."

References

External links
 
 
 Soundtrack album by Muller and Patton

American action films
2011 action films
Films set in the Philippines
Films shot in the Philippines
2010s English-language films
2010s American films